Noah Buschel (born 1978) is an American film director and screenwriter.

Early life
Buschel was born in Philadelphia and grew up in the Greenwich Village neighborhood of Manhattan, New York City.

Career
Buschel's first film, Bringing Rain, premiered at the 2003 Tribeca Film Festival. His second film, Neal Cassady, was distributed by IFC. His third, The Missing Person, premiered at the 2009 Sundance Film Festival and was distributed theatrically by Strand Releasing. It earned Buschel a 2009 Gotham Awards nomination for Breakthrough Director. He has collaborated with cinematographer Ryan Samul on four movies: The Missing Person, Sparrows Dance, Glass Chin and The Phenom. Matt Prigge of Metro New York wrote that, "Noah Buschel might be one of indies' most interesting filmmakers, all the more so because he doesn't belong to any easily promotable group or even genre."

Buschel was a contributing editor for Tricycle: The Buddhist Review and an essayist for Filmmaker Magazine. His topics have included gun violence in films.

Filmography

References

External links

1978 births
Living people
Writers from Philadelphia
People from Greenwich Village
American male screenwriters
Film directors from New York City
Screenwriters from New York (state)
Screenwriters from Pennsylvania